Kolessa is a Ukrainian surname. Notable people with the surname include:

Mykola Kolessa, Ukrainian composer and conductor
Lubka Kolessa, Ukrainian Canadian classical pianist
Filaret Kolessa, Ukrainian ethnographer, folklorist, and composer

Ukrainian-language surnames